Guillermo León Teillier del Valle (born Santa Bárbara, Chile, 29 October 1943) is a Chilean politician, educator, and writer who is the current president of the Communist Party of Chile. He was elected to the Chilean Chamber of Deputies for the electorate Nº 28 of Lo Espejo, Pedro Aguirre Cerda and San Miguel for the parliamentary term of 2010–2014.

References

External links

1943 births
Chilean people of French descent
Communist Party of Chile politicians
Living people
Members of the Chamber of Deputies of Chile
University of La Frontera alumni
Candidates for President of Chile
People from Bío Bío Province